Andorran Financial Authority (AFA), known as Andorran National Institute of Finance (INAF) between 1989 and 2018, is a public financial institution founded in 1989 that provides functions of financial regulation and control of the financial sector in Andorra.

Its regulatory task was used for describing the government measures to solve the Banca Privada d'Andorra financial crisis in 2015.

References

External links 
Homepage

Banks of Andorra
Central banks
Banks established in 1989
1989 establishments in Andorra